The 1941 Kentucky Derby was the 67th running of the Kentucky Derby. The race took place on May 3, 1941. Whirlaway's winning time set a Derby record (later broken).

Full results

 Winning breeder: Calumet Farm (KY)

References

1941
Kentucky Derby
Derby
May 1941 sports events